Asheville Outlets, formerly Biltmore Square Mall, is a shopping mall located just off Interstate 26 on Brevard Road (North Carolina Highway 191) in Asheville, North Carolina, United States. Outlet stores include Ann Taylor Factory Store, Banana Republic Factory Store, Brooks Brothers Factory Store, Coach, Cole Haan, GAP Factory Store, J. Crew Factory, Nike Factory Store, RH Outlet, Tommy Hilfiger, Under Armour, and Vera Bradley. Field & Stream did have a store but has since closed at Asheville Outlets and is now a Sportsman's Warehouse. The mall opened in 1989 as Biltmore Square Mall, featuring Hess's, Proffitt's, and Belk; when the original concept of the mall failed, it was reconstructed in 2014 as an outlet mall.

History
Biltmore Square Mall, the original shopping center on the site, was built in 1989 with Hess's, Proffitt's, and Belk as its anchor stores. The mall was developed by a joint venture of Crown American, Edward J. DeBartolo Corporation, and George H. V. Cecil.

In March 1998, the mall management (along with other plaintiffs) attempted to resist annexation into the city of Asheville. The attempt was unsuccessful.

In November 2006, Symphony Property Group and two local investment groups (collectively calling themselves Biltmore Eight, LLC) purchased the shopping center with the assistance of a third-party loan.

Cinebarre, a new concept in movie theaters and restaurants, was unveiled in the Biltmore Square Mall in 2007.  Food, beer, and wine are served before and during the screening of films in the theater.

The mall closed on January 31, 2014, except for the anchors and Dollar Tree. Belk closed at the end of 2014.

The redeveloped shopping center opened on May 1, 2015 as an outlet mall called Asheville Outlets. Developed by New England Development, its new anchor stores are Dillard's Clearance Center & Field & Stream with other stores including Nike Factory Store, Under Armour, Coach, Abercrombie & Fitch Outlet, Cole Haan, Tommy Hilfiger, Bath & Body Works and close to 65 other stores. It is an open-air mall that features covered breezeways and a fire and water fountain.

Anchor stores
Dillard's Clearance Center
RH Outlet (Restoration Hardware)

Junior anchors
Nike Factory Store
Under Armour
West Elm Outlet
Coach
VF Outlet

Former anchors
Belk
Steve & Barry's
Cinebarre Cinemas
Davis Furniture
Goody's Family Clothing
Proffitt's
Hess’s

External links
Asheville Outlets on MallSeeker
Biltmore factsheet

References

Shopping malls in North Carolina
Shopping malls established in 1989
Buildings and structures in Asheville, North Carolina
Tourist attractions in Asheville, North Carolina